USERN, the official acronym of Universal Scientific Education and Research Network, is non-governmental, non-profit organization and network for non-military scientific investigation and policy-making. USERN was established on 1 January 2016 and the basic statutes of USERN were drafted on 21 January 2015. Official inauguration of the statutes was held on 10 November 2016, the UN Day of Science for Peace and Development, after signing by hundreds of top 1% scientists worldwide.

USERN is an organization for the advancement of ethical and professional scientific research and education and for the advancement of science for non-military purposes.

Membership 
At the beginning of 2016, USERN started its official activities and after the first meeting, prompted further members to join via the USERN website. The USERN website however has always faced critics in its functionality as users have often reported trouble logging in, changing the password or editing their pages.

USERN Prize 
USERN Prize is an international award which would be annually bestowed to junior scientists or researchers less than 40 years of age for any novel advancement or achievement in scientific education, research, or serving the humanity in five scientific fields including medical sciences, life sciences, formal sciences, physical sciences, and social sciences.

USERN Prize Awarding Festival 
The closing day of congress and awarding the international rewards ceremony of USERN, the universal scientific education and research network prize or USERN prize will be awarded in 10 November the World Science Day for Peace and Development to 5 young scholars under 40 ages in different theoretical sciences (Mathematics and Computer), Physics sciences (Physics, Chemistry, Engineering), Environmental Sciences, Medical Sciences, and Social Sciences.

USERN Laureates 2016 
Floris De Lange (Netherlands) in Social Sciences

For: Expectation sharpens the visual response

Alexander Leemans (Belgium/Netherlands) in Medical Sciences

For: Processing and Visualization in Diffusion Imaging

Jamshid Aghaei (Iran) in Physical Sciences

For: Evaluating Technical Benefits and Risks of Renewable Energy Sources Increasing Penetration in Electrical Networks

Morteza Mahmoudi (Iran/USA) in Biological Sciences

For: Defining the Biological Identity of Nanotherapeutics for High Yield Cancer Therapy

Lucas Joppa (USA) in Formal Sciences

For: Technology for Nature

The Second International USERN Congress 
The 2nd international USERN congress was held in Kharkiv, Ukraine on 8 to 10 November 2017.

USERN Laureates 2017 

Matjaž Perc (Slovenia) in Social Sciences

For: Transitions Towards Cooperation in Human Societies

Lucina Qazi Uddin (USA) in Medical Sciences

For: Brain Dynamics and Flexible Behavior in Autism and Attention-Deficit/Hyperactivity

Maria-Magdalena Titirici (UK) in Physical Sciences

For: The Design of Efficient and Low Cost Electrocatalysts Catalysts Without the Use of Critical Metals

Valentina Cauda (Italy) in Biological Sciences

For: Hybrid Immune-Eluding Nanocrystals as Smart and Active Theranostic Weapons Against Cancer -TrojaNanoHorse

Manlio De Domenico (Italy) in Formal Sciences

For: Multilayer Structure and Dynamics of the Physical World: Modeling the Complexity of Systems of Systems

The Third International USERN Congress 
The 3rd international USERN congress was held in Reggio Calabria, Italy on 10 to 14 November 2018.

USERN Laureates 2018 
Igor Grossmann (Canada) in Social Sciences

For: Wisdom - Towards The Social and Behavioral Science of Sound Judgment

Gian Paolo Fadini (Italy) in Medical Sciences

For: Circulating Stem Cells in Diabetic Complications (Remediation)

Alex Fornito (Australia) in Biological Sciences

For: Maps, Models, and Modifiers of Brain Changes in Psychosis

Xavier Moya (UK) in Physical Sciences

For: Barocaloric Materials for Environment-Friendly Solid -State Refrigeration

Jacob Biamonte (Russia) in Formal Sciences

For: Quantum Enhanced Machine Learning

The Fourth International USERN Congress 
The 4th international USERN congress was held in Budapest, Hungary on 8 to 10 November 2019.

USERN Laureates 2019 
Benjamin Sovacool (Denmark, UK) in Social Sciences

For: Social Justice in an Era of Climate Change and Energy Scarcity

Eugenia Morselli (Chile) in Medical Sciences

For:  Mechanisms of Hypothalamic Autophagy in Obesity

Ajeet Kaushik (USA) in Biological Sciences

For:  Nano-Bio-Technology for Personalized Health Care

Giulia Grancini (Switzerland, Italy) in Physical-Chemical Sciences

For:  Multi-Dimensional Ferroelectric Hybrid Perovskites for Advanced Optoelectronics

Lucas Lacasa (UK) in Formal Sciences

For:  Bridging sIgnal Processing and NETwork science (BIPNET

The Fifth International USERN Congress 
The 5th international USERN congress was held in Tehran, Iran on 7 to 10 November 2020.

USERN Laureates 2020 
Lianne Schamaal (Australia) in Social Sciences

For: A Global Alliance to Elucidate Neurobiological Signatures of Depression and Suicide

Mohammad Ali Shahbazi (Finland) in Medical Sciences

For: A Thermo-responsive Biopolymeric Micro-implant for the Treatment of Autoimmune Disorders

Daniel Sauter (Germany) in Biological Sciences

For: Deciphering Molecular Determinants of Coronavirus Spread in the Human Population

Gregory Mark Allen Ashton (Australia) in Physical and Chemical Sciences

For: Black Holes and Neutron Stars: Enabling Astrophysics with Bilb y

Dongrui Wu (China) in Formal Sciences

For: Signal Processing and Machine Learning for Calibration-free and Secure Brain-Computer Interfaces (BCIs)

The sixth International USERN Congress 
The 6th international USERN congress was held in Istanbul, Turkey on 6 to 13 November 2021.

USERN Laureates 2021 

Xudong Zhao (China) in Formal Sciences

For: Control synthesis of switched systems

Minghao Yu (Germany) in Physical and Chemical Sciences

For: Developing sustainable energy storage devices with resource-aboundant raw materials

Federico Bella (Italy) in Biological Sciences

For: From air to fertilizers: zero-impact agriculture of the future

Hassan Abolhassani (Sweden) in Medical Sciences

For: Integrative Multi-Omics Analysis of Unsolved Inborn Errors of Immunity

Daniel King (Australia) in Social Sciences

For: Empowering vulnerable populations to overcome unhealthy gaming habits and gaming disorder

The seventh International USERN Congress 
The 7th international USERN congress was held in Muscat, Oman on 8 to10 November 2022.

USERN Laureates 2022 
Fabien Lotte (France) in Formal Sciences

For: BrainConquest: Boosting Brain-Computer Communication with high Quality User Training, for Healthy and Motor-Impaired Users alike

Mirjana Dimitrievska (Switzerland) in Physical and Chemical Sciences

For: SMARTCELL - Sustainable Materials for development of Advanced Renewable Technologies for the Next Generation Solar CELLs  

Jianing Fu (USA) in Biological Sciences

For: Functional Profile, Migration Pattern and Microenvironment of Human Hematopoietic Stem Cells in Ectopic Organs in Physiological and Inflammatory Conditions  

Sara De Biasi (Italy) in Medical Sciences

For: Unravelling the Role of MHC Class I–related Molecule–restricted T cells on Response to Anti-PD-1 Therapy in Metastatic Melanoma

Joseph Firth (England) in Social Sciences

For: Implementing Lifestyle Medicine into Youth Mental Healthcare: Improving Physical and Mental Health Outcomes in Young People

USERN Offices Worldwide 
Since the beginning of its establishment, and in order to promote universal scientific education and research, USERN has signed several Memorandum of Understanding (MOUs) and established several offices in scientific research centers and universities worldwide.

USERN Executive Directors 
 Dr. Sanam Ladi Seyedian (2016-2017) 
 Dr. Arya Aminorroaya, Dr. Sara Hanaei, Dr. Mahsa Keshavarz-Fathi (2018)
 Dr. Farnaz Delavari (2019)
 Dr. Saboura Ashkevarian (2020)
 Dr. Heliya Ziaei (2021-2022)
 Dr. Niloufar Yazdanpanah (2022-current)

See also 

 Nima Rezaei

Gallery

References

External links 
 

Iranian social networking websites
Professional networks
Scholarly communication